American indie rock musician Kevin Morby has released seven studio albums, thirteen singles, and eleven music videos.

Albums

Studio albums

Compilation albums

EP

Singles

Split singles

Album appearances

Music videos

References
General
 

Specific

External links

Discographies of American artists